The 2015–16 season of the Frauen-Bundesliga was the 26th season of Germany's premier women's football league. FC Bayern Munich successfully defended the title. This season started on 29 August 2015.

Teams
1. FC Köln was promoted from the 2014–15 Women's 2. Bundesliga south and Werder Bremen from the north group.

League table

Results

Top scorers

Hat-tricks

References

External links
Weltfussball.de
DFB.de

2015-16
1